Maang Bharo Sajana is a 1980 Indian Hindi-language drama film, produced by A. Purnachandra Rao under the Lakshmi Productions banner, and directed by T. Rama Rao. The film stars Jeetendra, Rekha, Moushumi Chatterjee, Kajal Kiran and music composed by Laxmikant–Pyarelal. The film is a remake of the Telugu film Karthika Deepam (1979). This was one of the four films T. Rama Rao directed with Jeetendra and Rekha that explored married relationships. The film did well commercially. Rekha was applauded for her performance as the other woman.

Plot
Chandru, a college student, is the son of Ram and Sita. Chandru is in a relationship with Geeta Sinha, the daughter of Doctor Sinha and they want to marry. One day, Dr. Sinha finds Geeta and Chandru on the road while Chandru's car has a puncture and they are asking for a lift. On recognizing Chandru he forbids Geeta from seeing him any further and after bringing Geeta home forbids her to leave home. Then he calls Ram (who is known to him) and tells him of the developments. He warns Ram to also forbid Chandru from seeing Geeta and not plan to marry her or he will suffer consequences. Ram feels insulted and when Chandru returns home, tells him that although Dr. Sinha has rejected his marriage proposal, Ram is with him and if Chandru manages to get Geeta of her free will into his home, he will arrange their marriage. Chandru manages to reach Geeta's bedroom and they elope to Chandru's home. When Doctor Sinha learns that Geeta has eloped, he goes to Ram's house, where the wedding is taking place, and insults Chandru, calling him a “bastard” and the like. Following this, Ram confesses to an event long ago, when he went to a construction site in UP near Benaras. He decided to visit a friend in Benaras who took him to a kotha where he had met Radha, a prostitute whom he rescued from her first client. Ram brought Radha to his construction site and they became close following the incident. After they fell in love, the river Ganges flooded and separated them. Ram thought Radha died and when he came home, his father had had a heart attack. Since his father was dying, his father asked him to marry Sita. Ram Kumar married Sita and was happy for 4–5 years and they had a son, Shaam. One day when he went to the railway station to pick up his mother-in-law, he saw Radha on the platform. He was happy that Radha was alive and took her to his guest house, telling her that for them to get married, he needs some time to talk to his family. Ram lacked the courage to tell Sita about Radha, so he hid the relationship from her, and continued the affair.

One day on a picnic with many children and their mothers, Sita met Radha, who saved baby Shaam from drowning in the swimming pool. They became friends. One day, Ram learned that Radha became pregnant, leaving Ram in a predicament. He tries to talk to Sita but fails. Meanwhile, Sita meets Radha in a sari store and Radha invites her to her home. Sita and Radha exchange notes about their husbands. After Radha's baby boy is born, Sita comes to Radha's home to take her for the Karva Chauth puja. Then Sita names the baby boy Chander Kumar (Chandru). After the puja, Sita takes Radha to her home to meet her husband and learns that Radha and her husband are not married due to the husband's problems. Them Ram enters and on seeing Ram, Radha leaves the scene silently. Sita takes up Radha's case and has Ram promise to get Radha justice from her husband. Ram goes to Radha's home and finds her packing up to leave after being betrayed by Ram. He then explains the whole story to her and promises to find a solution. The baby Chandru has a fever, so Ram and Radha take him to the hospital. Sita's mother sees the two of them leaving the hospital with the baby and tells Sita that Ram is the father of Radha's baby. Sita believes her and goes to Radha's home to offer her money to get out of Ram's life, calling her a "whore". Sita also tells her that one of them must die, so if Radha is not gone by the morning, Sita will kill herself. Ram comes to Radha's home and she tells him to go to Sita and pacify her, telling Sita that Radha is not a whore. Ram goes to Sita and tells her the whole story, clarifying that he was in love with Radha before he married Sita and he can't leave either of them, since they are both his loves. He tells Sita to take a call on the situation. Sita decides to accept Radha. On reaching Radha's home, Ram and Sita find that Radha has taken poison and Sita makes Ram fill Radha's Maang with red Sindoor from Sita's box. Radha receives a promise from Sita to bring up baby Chandru as her son. After Ram has finished telling his story, Dr. Sinha and his wife apologize to Ram and Sita, for the accusations, and Chandru and Geeta get married with everyone's blessings.

Cast

Jeetendra as Ram Kumar / Chandru (Double Role) 
Rekha as Radha
Moushumi Chatterjee as Sita 
Kajal Kiran as Geeta Sinha
Om Shivpuri as Dr. Sinha
Asrani as Jumerati
Chandana Choudhry as Sabeeha Khan
Yunus Parvez as Khan Sahib
Mohan Choti as Priest
Dheeraj Kumar as Shyam Kumar
Parveen Paul as Sita's Mother

Soundtrack
This was one of the first films for which Kavita Krishnamurthy sang. Anand Bakshi wrote all the lyrics.

Reception
The film did well at the box office. Dilip Thakur of The Times of India wrote of the film's storyline being "where a hero pleases an ordinary-looking girl but leaves her for an attractive woman". The film was described as one of the successful melodramas of T. Rama Rao. According to The Indian Journal of Social Work, Maang Bharo Sajana is one of the films which "reinstate the image of a feet-worshipping, passive wife".

References

External links 

1980 films
1980s Hindi-language films
Hindi remakes of Telugu films
Films directed by T. Rama Rao
Films scored by Laxmikant–Pyarelal